Steve Haskins (born November 13, 1958) is an American professional golfer who plays on the Champions Tour.

Haskins joined the Nationwide Tour in 1990 and won his first title the following year at the Ben Hogan New England Classic. He won his second event on Tour at the Buy.com Ozarks Open in 2001. He joined the Champions Tour in 2010, earning his card through qualifying school.

His father, Don, was a Hall of Fame basketball coach who led Texas Western College (now known as the University of Texas at El Paso) to the National Championship in 1966.

Professional wins (7)

Nationwide Tour wins (2)

*Note: The 2001 Buy.com Ozarks Open was shortened to 36 holes due to rain.

Nationwide Tour playoff record (0–1)

Other wins (5)
1986 New Mexico Open
1989 Bogey Hills Invitational
2000 Panama Open
???? 2 wins on the NGA Hooters Tour

Results in major championships

CUT = missed the half-way cut
Note: Haskins only played in the U.S. Open.

References

External links

American male golfers
New Mexico State Aggies men's golfers
PGA Tour golfers
PGA Tour Champions golfers
Golfers from Texas
People from Carson County, Texas
Sportspeople from El Paso, Texas
1958 births
Living people